A Soldier's Legacy is a novel by German author Heinrich Böll, published in 1982 (translator: Leila Vennewitz).

Written in 1948, the narrator writes about his dead friend Schelling, revealing his murder by the hated captain Schnecker.

References

1982 German novels
Novels by Heinrich Böll
Novels set during World War II
Epistolary novels
Novels set in France
Novels set in Russia